Myrmidon or Myrmidons may refer to:

Greek mythology
 Myrmidons, an ancient nation of Greek mythology
 Myrmidon (hero), the eponymous ancestor of the mythological Myrmidons
 Myrmidons, part of the lost tragedy Achilleis by Greek playwright Aeschylus

Modern fiction
Sergeant Myrmidon, a character from The Ballad of Halo Jones
A race in the game Myth: The Fallen Lords
A fictional monster from the book Shade's Children
The terrorist/military wing of a religious cult from the 2012 video game Zero Escape: Virtue's Last Reward
One name for a mysterious race of humanoids in the game Dragon's Dogma
A character class in the Nintendo video game series Fire Emblem
A warrior type of the Naga race in the Warcraft franchise

Vessels
HMS Myrmidon, the name of several British ships
 USS Myrmidon (ARL-16)

Other uses
Myrmidon of Athens, an Athenian commander of the 4th century BC
 Myrmidon Club, a dining club at Merton College, University of Oxford
 Operation Myrmidon, a planned raid during the Second World War on the Adour Estuary in south-western France
 Myrmidons of Melodrama, a compilation album by American pop girl group The Shangri-Las

See also
Myrmidone, a feminine name attributed to two characters in Greek mythology